Miss World 2000, the 50th anniversary of the Miss World pageant, was held on 30 November 2000 at the Millennium Dome in London, United Kingdom. The pageant's swimsuit segment was filmed in the Maldives.

The pageant was the first since the death of pageant owner Eric Morley, whose widow Julia Morley assumed responsibility for the event. The pageant had 95 contestants, the highest number of Miss World participants at that time.

The pageant was won by Priyanka Chopra of India, at the age of 18. She was crowned by her predecessor Yukta Mookhey also from India. She is the fifth Miss World and the second consecutive winner from her country. Internationally, Chopra reigned alongside Miss Universe 2000 titleholder Lara Dutta, marking the most recent time (as of ) that any country has held the two most prestigious beauty pageant titles in the world in a single year.

Results

Placements

Continental Queens of Beauty

Order of Announcements

Top 10

 Top 5

Contestants
A total of 95 contestants participated in Miss World 2000.

  – Luciah Hedrington
  – Deolinda Vilela
  – Daniela Stucan
  – Monique van der Horn
  – Renee Henderson
  – Patricia Kaiser
  – Latia Bowe
  – Sonia Gazi
  – Leilani McConney
  – Sviatlana Kruk
  – Joke van de Velde
  – Jimena Rico Toro
  – Jasmina Mahmutović
  – Puna Keleabetswe Serati
  – Francine Eickemberg
  – Nadia Harrigan Ubinas
  – Ivanka Peytcheva
  – Christine Cho
  – Jacqueline Bush
  – Isabel Bawlitza
  – Shu-Ting Hao
  – Andrea Durán
  – Cristina de Mezerville
  – Andreja Čupor
  – Jozaine Wall
  – Ifigenia Papaioannou
  – Michaela Salačová
  – Anne Katrin Vrang
  – Gilda Jovine
  – Ana Dolores Murillo
  – Michelle Walker
  – Irina Ovtchinnikova
  – Salima Peippo
  – Karine Meier
  – Natascha Berg
  – Maame Ewarfaah Hawkson
  – Tessa Sacramento
  – Athanasia Tzoulaki
  – Cindy Ramírez
  – Raja Moussaoui
  – Verónica Rivera
  – Margaret Kan
  – Judit Kuchta
  – Elva Dögg Melsted
  – Priyanka Chopra 
  – Yvonne Ellard
  – Dana Dantes
  – Giorgia Palmas
  – Ayisha Richards
  – Mariko Sugai
  – Margarita Kravtsova
  – Yolanda Masinde
  – Jung-sun Shin
  – Sandra Rizk
  – Martyna Bimbaite
  – Julianna Todimarina
  – Tan Sun Wei
  – Katia Grima
  – Paulina Flores Arias
  – Mariana Moraru †
  – Mia de Klerk
  – Usha Khadgi
  – Katherine Allsopp-Smith
  – Matilda Kerry
  – Julie Lee-Ann Martin
  – Stine Pedersen
  – Ana Raquel Ochy
  – Patricia Villanueva
  – Tatiana Angulo
  – Katherine Annwen de Guzman
  – Justyna Bergmann
  – Gilda Dias Pe-Curto
  – Sarybel Velilla
  – Aleksandra Cosmoiu
  – Anna Bodareva
  – Michelle Watson
  – Charlyn Ding Zung Ee
  – Janka Horecna
  – Maša Merc
  – Heather Joy Hamilton
  – Verónica García
  – Ganga Gunasekera
  – Ida Sofia Manneh
  – Mahara McKay
  – Vanini Bea
  – Jacqueline Ntuyabelikwe
  – Rhonda Rosemin
  – Yuksel Ak
  – Olena Shcherban
  – Angelique Breaux
  – Katja Thomsen
  – Vanessa Cárdenas
  – Sophie-Kate Cahill
  – Iva Milivojević
  – Victoria Moyo

Judges

 Stephanie Beacham
 Ozwald Boateng
 Errol Brown †
 Lulu
 Terry O'Neill †
 Lucy Sykes
 Hemant Trivedi
 Amanda Wakeley
 Shah Rukh Khan

Notes

Debuts

Returns

Last competed in 1995:
 
 
Last competed in 1997:
 
Last competed in 1998:

Replacements
  – Cecilie Elisa Dahlstrøm
  –  Ekaterina Izmail - Dethroned of her crown due to marriage 
  – Jacqueline Bracamontes won Nuestra Belleza Mundo México 2000 and supposed to represent Mexico at Miss World that year, however she decided to enter Nuestra Belleza Mexico 2000 and won the contest, but as she won 2 contests Lupita Jones president of Nuestra Belleza México, decides to appoint Paulina Flores Arias - (Suplente of Nuestra Belleza México 2000 pageant) to compete at Miss World 2000.
  – Miss Moldova 2000, Irina Babusenko didn't go to Miss World 2000 due to her being underage. She was replaced by her 1st runner up Mariana Moraru.

Withdrawals
  – No contest.
  – Miss Latvia 1999, Dina Kalandārova withdrew at the last minute due to personal reasons. She competed in Miss World 2001 instead.
  – No contest.
  – Angelique Romou went to Miss Universe instead.
  – No contest.
  – No contest.
  – No longer competes as United Kingdom. Now competes as its constituent countries instead, England, Northern Ireland, Scotland and Wales.
  – No contest.

References

External links
 Pageantopolis – Miss World 2000

Miss World
2000 in the United Kingdom
2000 beauty pageants
Beauty pageants in the United Kingdom
November 2000 events in the United Kingdom